The BBC Sports Personality of the Year Lifetime Achievement Award is an award given annually as part of the BBC Sports Personality of the Year ceremony each December. The award is given to a sportsperson "who has made a major impact on the world of sport during their lifetime". The winner is selected by BBC Sport. When football manager Alex Ferguson won the award in 2001, the BBC described the award as "a new accolade" to be presented annually; however, two people had already received the Lifetime Achievement Award.

The inaugural recipient of the award was Frank Bruno in 1996, who won it after his retirement from boxing that year. Bruno was the favourite to win the main award in 1995, but lost to Damon Hill, causing many to criticise his Lifetime Achievement Award as being a consolation award. Spanish golfer Seve Ballesteros won the award the following year, but after that the award was not presented for three years. The award has been presented annually since Ferguson ended the hiatus in 2001. Five of the eleven recipients have been associated with football; tennis and golf are the only other sports to have been represented more than once. Tennis player Martina Navratilova was the first woman to have won the award. The only recipient of the award on multiple occasions is Ballesteros who won in 1997 and again in 2009, for his contribution to golf winning "the Open three times, the Masters twice as well as playing an inspirational role in the Ryder Cup". The most recent winner, in 2019, was British paralympian Tanni Grey-Thompson.

Winners

By year

By nationality

By sport 
This table lists the total number of awards won by the winners sporting profession.

References

General
 
Specific

Lifetime Achievement
Awards established in 1996
Lifetime achievement awards
1996 establishments in the United Kingdom